Flannery is a 2019 documentary film from Long Distance Productions about American novelist Flannery O'Connor.

The film had its world premiere in October 2019 at the opening night of the Hot Springs Documentary Film Festival, as well as additional screenings at the New Orleans Film Festival and Austin Film Festival.

Cast
Persons appearing in the film include:

 Mary Steenburgen - Narrator
 Hilton Als - Self
 Sally Fitzgerald - Self 
 Michael Fitzgerald - Self 
 Robert Giroux - Self 
 Mary Gordon - Self
 Mary Karr - Self
 Tommy Lee Jones - Self
 Alice McDermott - Self
 Conan O'Brien - Self
 Alice Walker - Self
 Tobias Wolff - Self

Production 
Directed by Elizabeth Coffman and Mark Bosco, Flannery is the first National Endowment for the Humanities feature documentary to explore the life of acclaimed southern U.S. writer Flannery O'Connor.

Coffman is a documentary filmmaker, scholar and professor at Loyola University Chicago. She owns and directs films with Ted Hardin of Long Distance Productions. Bosco is a Jesuit priest, O'Connor scholar and Vice President for Mission and Ministry at Georgetown University.

The score for the film, by award-winning composer Miriam Cutler ("RBG", "Dark Money") includes O'Connor-inspired songs by Bruce Springsteen and Lucinda Williams. With animations, letters, never-before-seen photographs and archival footage, soul-raising music and insights from top American writers, actors and critics, the film illustrates the life of the brilliant and reclusive writer. A soundtrack album was released by Perseverance Records in 2021. 

Executive producers include Bob Hercules, Christopher O’Hare and Stefan Sonnenfeld.

Release 
Flannery had its world premiere in October 2019 at the Hot Springs Documentary Film Festival.

The film won the first Library of Congress Lavine/Ken Burns Prize for Film. Filmmaker Ken Burns, who chairs his namesake award, said in regard to the film, "Flannery is an extraordinary documentary that allows us to follow the creative process of one of our country’s greatest writers." In October 2019, it was awarded the prize for best Documentary Feature at the Austin Film Festival.

Flannery received generally positive reviews from critics. The website's critics consensus reads: "Flannerys filmmaking doesn't live up to its subject's classic work, but it remains a reasonably engaging introduction."

References

External links 
Official site	

Library of Congress Lavine/Ken Burns Prize for Film

2019 films
2019 documentary films